was a Japanese goze, singing songs accompanied by shamisen. Kobayashi became blind at three months old. She started goze training at age five and started her career at age eight.  She continued performing until 1978, traveling throughout most of Niigata Prefecture as well as through parts of the Yamagata and Fukushima Prefectures. In 1978, she was named one of the Living National Treasures of Japan, as a key figure of the traditional goze art form. In 1979, she was awarded the Medal of Honor with Yellow Ribbon.

Childhood
Kobayashi was born on 24 January 1900, the youngest daughter of four siblings in the area currently known as Sanjo, Niigata Prefecture. She was born to a relatively wealthy farming family of the Shoya class. At three months of age, she lost her eyesight in both eyes due to cataracts;, and her family was told that there was no hope of recovery. In 1902, her father died; at that time, her mother had asthma. Kobayashi was brought up by her great-uncle, the younger brother of her grandfather.

Her foster family feared the stigma of discrimination, so Kobayashi was confined to her bedroom. She had to eat meals there, and her food and water intake were limited to minimize her need to use the toilet, as each trip would have necessitated the assistance of family members and exposed her to passersby, as toilets were commonly in outhouses at the time. She was told not to speak unless spoken to. She was not called by her name; only "mekurakko" (blind woman) or "tochi" (the short form of tochi-mekura, a slang term). Her brother, who was sixteen years older than her, teased her and told her he could not marry because of her. She could not remember her exact date of birth. A fortune-teller foretold that she would live a long life, and her family considered how she might make a living. At that time, blind persons had limited means to earn a living. Careers open to them included acupuncture, massage, and playing music on the koto or the shamisen. Acupuncture was selected for her, but when she first met the acupuncturist, he was drunk and told her that he would perform acupuncture on her if she did not study hard, frightening her enough to abandon acupuncture.

Training and apprenticeship
Subsequently, goze was decided upon, and Fuji Higuchi became her tutor. At the request of her teacher, Haru's mother taught her daughter womanly disciplines very strictly, including sewing, how to dress by herself, and how to pack and carry her things by herself. If she failed, she could not eat meals. In March 1905, she formally began as a goze, as her family agreed to a 21-year-long contract with Fuji for taking Haru in apprenticeship. Her family paid the expenses of education and other costs in advance, and if she discontinued the apprenticeship, a breach-of-contract fee would have to be paid to Fuji. Haru was given the goze name "Sumi" and was subsequently homeschooled, but also traveled with her teacher.

In the summer of 1907, Haru first started playing the shamisen. As she was still young, the strings made her fingers bleed. Her mother scared her by saying she would drown Haru if she said the word "painful". She began to practice Kangoe, a vocal style specific to goze. This could be achieved through practice, ideally in a cold environment.  Haru practiced on the banks of the Shinano River, despite her bleeding throat and thin clothes.

In the spring of 1908, she was allowed to go out on Higuchi's order, who wanted her to be accustomed to walking. While walking with some of the girls she met, Haru picked flowers of various colors, while her friends picked only red flowers. She had no concept of color because she was blind. Her mother cried and taught the idea of colors to Haru. Haru was taught that there was no other way of living other than a goze. In 1908, Fuji, Haru, and two other older apprentices went on a journey, working as goze. Haru's uncle declared that Haru should not return home if she failed, this would be a breach of contract and money would be owed.

Transition and proficiency
At age twelve, she was given a shamisen sized for adults. At age thirteen, she was allowed to play duets (nichoushamisen); this marked her becoming a "true" goze. However, Fuji did not value Haru highly, because Haru's family were hunters, so Haru was thought to be cursed with ill fortune. In 1915, her apprenticeship was discontinued without the fee, since Haru was not allowed to follow on a goze journey.  Medical examinations revealed many fissures along Haru's leg bones, due to Fuji's habitual abuse. In the same year, Haru entered into an apprenticeship with Sawa Hatsuji of Nagaoka, with the approval of Goi Yamamoto, the boss of the goze organization of Nagaoka. She praised Haru's technique, and Haru was allowed to wear the under-garment with red han-eri, which was a sign of a fully-fledged goze. After she switched teachers, her condition improved along with her skill.

Career
In 1921, her teacher Sawa Hatsuji died, and Haru decided to study under Tsuru Sakai. Haru herself taught her lower apprentices kindheartedly. Tsuru allowed Haru to use a leather shamisen and a tortoiseshell bachi; these also symbolized the fact that she was a full-fledged goze. Tsuru retired and Haru became the leader of her goze group.

In 1933, Haru became independent but continued to help her teacher. In 1935, Misu Tsuchida, one of Haru's apprentices, was going to marry a masseur and suggested that Haru adopt her, so they could live in one house. Haru accepted, but the masseur already had a wife. The newly constructed house that Haru had paid for was taken over by the wife. Misu's lover took the money earned by Haru. In 1934, Haru went back to Nagaoka, but there was nowhere available to live. She moved to a Tenrikyo church, where two visually-impaired gozes lived. On August 1, 1945, the goze house was destroyed during an air raid. There were no fatalities because they were all away from the building. Haru's party returned to Nagaoka, thankful that the church had not been destroyed by the raids.

By March 1982, she was living in the special home for the blind and elderly called Tainai Yasuragino Ie.  Later she visited her birthplace and the grave of her mother, and performed an address to a kami called Matsuzaka. Although her family asked her to come back home, she refused. She even refused the idea that her bones should be buried in the family grave.

Retirement
Haru was asked to educate a girl named Kimi as a goze. The girl had clear eyesight, but the requestee wanted to get rid of her. Eventually, after seven years of training, Haru left the Takase hot spring and went to Agano hot spring where she succeeded in leaving the requestee, who had become sick, in 1960, and therefore Haru adopted the girl as her daughter. Television was rising in popularity, and the popularity of gozes was falling. She lived as a masseuse, although she was sometimes asked to play as a goze. On May 28, 1973, Haru declared her retirement as a goze and gave her shamisen to an acquaintance. She visited a temple every day, but television reporters were always waiting there for her.

Revival
Even after Haru retired as a goze, she attracted the attention of the public when she performed before the scholars of folk arts at Kokugakuin University. The education committee of Shibata city decided to record the goze performances, and she began to perform again. In July 1977 she went into the Tainai Yasuragino Ie, a special home for the aged, and was united with former gozes. By the 1980s, the previous gozes who had worked in the region lived in the same home for the aged. The project of the education committee continued between 1973 and 1975, recording 40 tapes of 120 minutes each. Parts of them were broadcast through NHK/
Reiko Takeshita (竹下玲子) was accepted as a new student of goze, and Naoko Kayamori (萱森直子) became the last student. On 25 March 1977, Haru was credited as a preserver of goze activities, and on 29 April 1979, she was given the Medal of Honour with Yellow Ribbon.

Age 100
In 2000, Haru was 100 years old, and she was awarded a special award by Sanjo city. In 2001, she was made a special citizen of Sanjo city. In 2002, she was awarded the 36th Eiji Yoshikawa award. On 25 April 2005, she died of old age.

Performances and technique
Reiko Takeshita, her student, commented that her singing was like that of Bel canto. According to her, three experienced singers sang at the same time, but Haru's voice was the loudest.

Haru's tone was constant, and there was no rising or falling. Masako Shirasu commented that Haru's voice was more or less monotonous.Takeshita once asked Haru whether emotion should affect singing, and she answered no.

Naoko Kayamori, another student, wrote that Haru could sing three different ways, likely because of her three different teachers. According to Haru, she had difficulties adapting herself to new circumstances.

Haru had a brilliant memory, possibly because she could not see. Jun-ichi Sakuma wrote that the education committee of Shibata city was surprised that Haru remembered several hundred goze songs, and she memorized every song when she heard it only once.  Gerald Groemer, a scholar of music, compared her performances Awatokushimajuurobee and Kuzunoha no Kowakare(阿波徳島十郎兵衛 and 葛の葉子別れ) played 20 years apart, and found practically no difference between them. Haru said that any songs she remembered were neither what she wanted to master, nor what she mastered with pleasure. She thought it was her job. In the house of the aged, Haru belonged to a music club, but commented that folk songs and popular songs were difficult.

Personality
Haru's mother told her that she should answer "yes" to any request and not express her opinions, since Haru could not see, and had to be cared for throughout her life.She was told that she should not bother anyone, and do anything by herself, and she should not do anything that would cause others to dislike her. Shomoju pointed out that these rules of Haru's mother governed her behaviour throughout her life. She remained good-natured, and accepted her destiny impressively. But at the same time, her convictions made her life full of difficulties. Haru accepted anything which occurred to her as a festival if she walked with good people, and if she walked with bad people, she accepted it as 'training'. Sakuma wrote that Haru was a rare good-natured person, while other gozes thought that Haru was an exceptionally unlucky person. Haru had a number of unfortunate events occur throughout her life, but her character remained solid. Being a goze made her face anyone with the same sentiment as those with eyesight.(298). Good nature and sincerity might be of her own character, but the education by Haru's mother was great.

Shimoju commented on the behavior of Haru at the Yasuragi no Ie (home for the aged).  Tomoko Matsui, a cameraman who took pictures of Haru, said that Haru never expressed anything which would make others look upon her with scrutiny.

Painter Susumu Kinoshita drew pictures of Haru for 20 years, starting in 1982. According to Kinoshita, her face was different every time he drew a picture of her. Shimoju wrote that Haru was usually very dignified, but looked weary while alone.

Philosophy
On her personal philosophy, Haru said

Kusumi Kawano wrote that

A monk who gave Haru a Dharma name said that

References
Osamu Akiya, 説経節の伝統 説経祭文と越後瞽女(Tradition of Saimon and Niigata Goze)1987,  Hitotsubashi Souron, 97, 3,  pp304–326
Seiji Kiryu, 最後の瞽女 小林ハルの人生,(The life of Kobayashi Haru, the last Goze) 2000, Bungeisha, 
Groemer, Gerald.  A study on Goze and their songs(瞽女と瞽女唄の研究 研究篇) 2007, University of Nagoya Press, 
Haru Kobayashi(narrator) and Kusumi Kawano, Kobayashi Haru looking for light - 105 year old last Goze(小林ハル光を求めた一〇五歳 最後の瞽女) 2005, NHK Shuppan. 
Jun-ichi Sakuma, The folklore of Goze(瞽女の民俗), 1983, Iwasaki Bijutsusha, 
Akiko Shimoju, Steel woman, the last goze Kobayashi Haru(鋼の女 最後の瞽女・小林ハル) 2003, Shueisha,
Shin-ichi Harada, An introduction to the life of Goze (近世における瞽女の生活論序説 ), 1998, Komazawa Shakaigakukenkyu, pp75–100
Shoko Honma, The travel of blind Kobayashi Haru(小林ハル盲目の旅人) 2001, Kyuuryuudo, 
Tetsuo Yamaore, The spiritual history of poems(「歌」の精神史), 2003, Chuokoronshinsha, 
Petreca, Guilherme and Minamisawa, Tiago, Shamisen. Cancoes do Mundo Flutuante, 2021, Pipoca & Nanquim,

Footnotes

External links
 盲目の旅人…最後の瞽女　小林ハル - 日本テレビ「知ってるつもり?!」The last Goze, Japan Television  showing a picture of Haru Kobayashi
 瞽女ふたたびの道 Goze restarted
 越後瞽女唄と津軽三味線 萱森直子Niigata goze songs and Aomori Shamisen

Shamisen players
Japanese women musicians
Japanese musicians
1900 births
2005 deaths
Japanese traditional music
Japanese centenarians
Japanese blind people
20th-century women musicians
Women centenarians
Blind musicians